

Language 

Leonese language is widely spoken in this area.

See also 
Cabreira Comarca
 Kingdom of León
 Leonese language

References

Municipalities in the Province of León